Arno Ehret (born 11 December 1953 in Lahr) is a former West German handball player who competed in the 1976 Summer Olympics.

In 1976, he was part of the West German team which finished fourth in the Olympic tournament. He played all six matches and scored 21 goals.

References

1953 births
Living people
West German male handball players
Olympic handball players of West Germany
Handball players at the 1976 Summer Olympics
People from Lahr
Sportspeople from Freiburg (region)